Jaipur–Udaipur City Antyodaya Express is an Antyodaya class of superfast express train belonging to  division, North Western Railway that it planned to be run between  and  . It is planned to be operated with 20971/20972 train numbers on Daily basis.

Service 

The Jaipur to Udaipur city train (20971) is proposed to leaves Jaipur junction every day at 6:15 p.m. and reaches  Udaipur at 1:30 p.m. The reverse train (20971) leaves Udaipur every day at 3:05 p.m. and reaches Jaipur junction at 10:25 p.m the next day.

Route and halts

Coach composition 
The trains is completely LHB general coaches (unreserved) designed by Indian Railways with features of LED screen display to show information about stations, train speed etc. Vending machines for water. Bio toilets in compartments as well as CCTV cameras and mobile charging points and toilet occupancy indicators. The rake of this train is not sharing with any other services and the maintenance is done at Jaipur junction.

See also 
 Antyodaya Express

Notes

References

External links

Antyodaya Express trains
Train-related introductions in 2021